The Tanzer 16 is a Canadian sailboat, that was designed by Johann Tanzer and first built in 1963. The design is out of production.

Derived from the similar 1963 Constellation 16, the Tanzer 16 design was developed into the Overnighter 16 in 1964, by the addition of a cuddy cabin.

Production
The boat was built by Tanzer Industries in Canada and remained in production until the company went out of business in 1986.

The boat's class association acquired the tooling for the design after Tanzer Industries closed down, but it is unknown if more examples have been produced since then.

Design
The Tanzer 16 is a small recreational sailing dinghy, built predominantly of fibreglass, aluminum spars and oiled teak wood trim. It has a fractional sloop rig, with a roller-reefing boom, a transom-hung kick-up rudder, a spooned stem and a kick-up centreboard keel. It displaces  and has foam flotation.

Its broad beam and low centre-of-gravity result in increased stability.

The design has a Portsmouth Yardstick racing average handicap of 98.3.

Variants
Constellation 16
Original Johann Tanzer design of 1963. Length overall , displacement .
Tanzer 16
Renamed Constellation 16, 1900 examples were completed. In production 1963–86. Length overall , displacement . It has storage available in the lazarette and in the cockpit side compartments, as well as on a shelf under the foredeck.
Overnighter 16
Development of the Tanzer 16, with the addition of sleeping accommodations in the form of a cuddy cabin, with two bunks. 550 examples were built, starting in 1964. Length overall , displacement .

See also
List of sailing boat types

Similar sailboats
Balboa 16
Bombardier 4.8
Catalina 16.5
DS-16
Laguna 16
Leeward 16
Nordica 16
Sirocco 15
Wayfarer (dinghy)

References

Dinghies
1960s sailboat type designs
Sailing yachts
Sailboat type designs by Johann Tanzer
Sailboat types built by Tanzer Industries